Jon Edwards is an American chess player. He won the 32nd World Correspondence Chess Championship in 2022.

Edwards started playing correspondence chess via the International Correspondence Chess Federation in 1995, becoming an ICCF Grandmaster in 2022.

References

External links
 

Living people
American chess players
American chess writers
American male non-fiction writers
20th-century American male writers
Correspondence chess grandmasters
Year of birth missing (living people)
Place of birth missing (living people)
World Correspondence Chess Champions